Kamionka Brodnicka  is a village in the administrative district of Gmina Kartuzy, within Kartuzy County, Pomeranian Voivodeship, in northern Poland.

For details of the history of the region, see History of Pomerania.

References

Kamionka Brodnicka